The 1985–86 Scottish Inter-District Championship was a rugby union competition for Scotland's district teams.

This season saw the 33nd Scottish Inter-District Championship.

South won the competition with 4 wins.

History

The South beat their own record in the Scottish Inter-District Championship this season, by winning their 18th consecutive inter-district match in the championship. A run which began in season 1981-82.

1985-86 League Table

Results

Round 1

Edinburgh District: 

North and Midlands:

South of Scotland: 

Glasgow District:

Round 2

South of Scotland: 

North and Midlands:

Round 3

North and Midlands: 

Anglo-Scots:

Edinburgh District: 

South of Scotland:

Round 4

Glasgow District: 

Anglo-Scots:

Round 5

Anglo-Scots: 

Edinburgh District: 

North and Midlands: 

Glasgow District:

Round 6

Edinburgh District: 

Glasgow District: 

Anglo-Scots: 

South of Scotland:

Matches outwith the Championship

Other Scottish matches

Combined Scottish Districts: 

South of Scotland:

Trial matches

Blues: 

Reds:

References

1985–86 in Scottish rugby union
1985-86